Frans Albert Hjalmar Väre (22 July 1892 – 20 March 1952) was a Finnish road racing cyclist who competed in the 1912 Summer Olympics. He was born in Vihti and died in Turku.

In 1912 he was a member of the Finnish cycling team which finished fifth in the team time trial event. In the individual time trial competition he finished 66th.

References

1892 births
1952 deaths
People from Vihti
Finnish male cyclists
Olympic cyclists of Finland
Cyclists at the 1912 Summer Olympics
Sportspeople from Uusimaa